Samuel George Davis MM (born 1890; date of death unknown) was an English professional footballer who played in the Football League for Newport County as a right back.

Personal life 
Davis enlisted as a private in the Football Battalion of the Middlesex Regiment during the First World War and spent time attached to a Light Trench Mortar Battery. He was commissioned into the Duke of Cornwall's Light Infantry in October 1917 and ended the war with the rank of captain. He won the Military Medal during the course of his service.

Career statistics

References

1890 births
Footballers from Plymouth, Devon
English footballers
Association football fullbacks
English Football League players
British Army personnel of World War I
Date of death missing
Middlesex Regiment soldiers
Duke of Cornwall's Light Infantry officers
Plymouth Argyle F.C. players
Gillingham F.C. wartime guest players
Newport County A.F.C. players
Torquay United F.C. players
Southern Football League players
Recipients of the Military Medal
Year of death unknown
Date of birth unknown
Military personnel from Plymouth, Devon